Vogue Polska (meaning Vogue Poland) is the Polish edition of the American fashion and lifestyle monthly magazine Vogue. The magazine has been published since February 2018 and is the twenty-third local edition of Vogue.

Publication history
In June 2017, it was announced that the Polish edition of Vogue was in preparation, with Filip Niedenthal as editor-in-chief. The local publisher, Visteria, signed a 5-year licence deal with the publisher of the original American version, Condé Nast, which was later extended for another five years. The printed magazine and its website were launched simultaneously on 14 February 2018. The circulation of the first issue was 160,000 copies and its cover featured the Polish models Anja Rubik and Małgosia Bela.

Special issues and supplements 
Vogue Polska has published a number of one-time and ongoing special issues and supplements, including Vogue Beauty, Vogue Travel, Vogue Living, Vogue Man, and Vogue Leaders.

Controversy
The cover photography of the first issue caused controversy in Poland as the photographer, Jürgen Teller, featured Rubik and Bela standing next to a vintage Soviet-produced Volga GAZ-24 car and with Warsaw's Palace of Culture and Science in the background. In Poland, this car and this building are perceived as symbols of Stalinism and the communist oppression, which raised questions about the political and ideological profile of the magazine and the aesthetics it was going to promote.

See also 

 List of Vogue Polska cover models

References

2018 establishments in Poland
Lifestyle magazines
Magazines established in 2018
Magazines published in Warsaw
Monthly magazines published in Poland
Polish-language magazines
Poland
Women's fashion magazines
Women's magazines published in Poland
Polish fashion